That'll Teach 'Em is a British historical reality documentary series produced by Twenty Twenty Television for the Channel 4 network in the United Kingdom.

Concept
Each series follows around 30 teenage students who have recently completed their GCSEs as they are taken back to a 1950s/1960s style British boarding school. The show sets out to analyse whether the standards that were integral to the school life of the time could help to produce better exam results, when compared to the current GCSE results and to compare certain contemporary educational methods with modern ones (e.g. vocational vs. academic focus for the less "gifted").

As part of the experience, the participants are expected to board at a traditional school house, abiding by strict discipline, adopting to 1950s/1960s diet and following a strict uniform dress code, the only difference being the absence of corporal punishment as it was made illegal in all state schools in Britain in 1986, and in all private schools in England and Wales in 1998. Because of that, other strict punishments, most notably writing lines and essays and holding up heavy items for a certain amount of time were used instead. Throughout the series, a number of students have either been expelled for misconduct, or have chosen to leave the school voluntarily.

After four weeks, the students then take their final exams, produced to the same standard as contemporary GCE O Levels and CSEs.

There were three series of the show, the first airing in August 2003 (recreating a 1950s grammar school and featuring academically high-achieving pupils), the second in August 2004 (a 1960s secondary modern and the academically average or poor)  and the third and final series in April 2006 (a 1950s grammar school with high-achieving pupils again, this time focusing on practical sciences and with single-sex classes).

Series overview

Series 1 (2003)
The first series of the show was filmed over 4 weeks in July and August 2003, at the Royal Grammar School, High Wycombe.  It featured 15 boys and 15 girls who had just sat their GCSEs and mostly did well, though some failed. The school was branded as 'King's School'.

Joe McCready was expelled during the series for persistent bad behaviour and disrespect. In episode 3, Nadia Freeman chose to leave the school voluntarily due to the food. In the fourth episode, Mr. Perry served as acting headmaster due to Mr. MacTavish being unwell at the time.

Series 2 (2004)
The second series of the show, called "That'll Teach ‘Em Too", was also filmed at the Royal Grammar School, High Wycombe in August 2004  and was known as 'Hope Green Secondary Modern'

Sophia chose to leave the school voluntarily because of behaviour. Though it was never shown, Aliss Hadley, Lewis Davis and Holly left as well. This was the only season in which no students were expelled. Most students only passed 1 CSE. Like Series 1, 15 boys and 15 girls entered the school at the start, and 26 finished.

Series 3 (2005–06)
Series 3 was filmed during August 2005 at St Joseph's College in Ipswich, and broadcast during the following April. The series returned to the setting of a 1950s grammar school. The school was branded as 'Charles Darwin Grammar' and focused predominately on practical sciences. It also experimented with boys and girls being taught separately. The languages teacher in series 1, Simon Warr, took on the role of headmaster in Series 3.

Scott Peters was expelled during the series for persistent bad behaviour and disrespect, and Brennon Gunston, Rosie Morton and Amy Jampa-Ngoen chose to leave the school voluntarily, although Mr. Warr gave Amy his explicit blessing to leave due her poor conduct record. After failing to stop some girls from using the telephone in the laundry room, Victoria Buxton was forced to step down from her position as Head Girl, and her role was filled by Sally Rushton. In addition, Brennon Gunston and Rosie Morton were replaced with Joe Seath and Francesca Bruce respectively. In the academic competition between the girls and the boys, the girls won overall, and most students only managed to pass one O Level.

That'll Test 'Em
For the third series, a spin-off series, That'll Test 'Em, aired on More4 after the main programme. It saw pupils featured in the That'll Teach 'Em episode just aired being quizzed in competition with their parents on topics that they should have known well after their time in 1950s/1960s education.

International versions
The format from the series has been adapted in 8 countries, France, Spain, Norway, Germany, Belgium, Italy, Netherlands and Russia. The international rights are distributed by DRG.

References

External links
 danielpemberton.com – Website of composer of music for the show

Channel 4 documentary series
2003 British television series debuts
2006 British television series endings
2000s British reality television series
Historical reality television series